Framland was a hundred in north-east Leicestershire, England, roughly corresponding to today's borough of Melton. It was recorded in the Domesday Book as one of Leicestershire's four wapentakes.

The name remains in use as a deanery of the Diocese of Leicester in the Church of England.

The original meeting place of the hundred was at Great Framland.

References

External links
Map of Framland

Ancient subdivisions of Leicestershire